Carlos Romero may refer to:

 Carlos Romero (actor) (1927–2007), American actor
 Carlos Romero (footballer, born 1927) (1927–1999), Uruguayan footballer, who played for Danubio
 Carlos Romero (footballer, born 2001), Spanish footballer
 Carlos Romero (football coach) (born 1966), Salvadorean former footballer and subsequently football manager
 Carlos Romero Bonifaz (born 1966), Bolivian government official and lawyer
 Carlos Romero (wrestler, born 1997), Chilean freestyle wrestler
 Carlos Romero (wrestler, born 1942), Mexican freestyle wrestler
 Carlos Humberto Romero (1924–2017), president of El Salvador
 Carlos Romero (screenwriter) (1945), Mexican screenwriter, including on telenovela María la del Barrio
 Carlos Romero (Spanish politician) (born 1941), Spanish government minister between 1982 and 1991
 Carlos Romero Giménez (born 1890), Spanish Republican officer and French Resistance member